Joseph Krabbenhoft (born March 24, 1987) is a retired American professional basketball player and current associate head coach at the University of Wisconsin.

College career
Born in Spring Valley, Illinois, Krabbenhoft played college basketball for the Wisconsin Badgers from 2005 to 2009.

Professional career
Krabbenhoft began his professional career in 2009 with the NBA D-League club Sioux Falls Skyforce. He then moved to the Korean League club Seoul SK Knights. He next signed with the Spanish Second Division club CE Lleida Bàsquet at the start of the 2010-11 season, before moving that same season to the Greek League club Panellinios Basket.

Coaching career
On July 11, 2012, the University of Wisconsin announced that Krabbenhoft had been hired as the new video coordinator on head coach Bo Ryan's staff for the 2012-2013 men's basketball season. He succeeded former Wisconsin guard and current UW-Milwaukee assistant coach Sharif Chambliss in the role. After a year as the Badgers' video coordinator, South Dakota State hired Krabbenhoft as an assistant coach. Krabbenhoft spent three seasons coaching at South Dakota State before returning to Wisconsin as an assistant head coach under head coach Greg Gard in 2016.

2022 postgame incident
In 2022, University of Michigan head basketball Coach Juwan Howard reached across two assistant coaches that were holding him back and hit Krabbenhoft in the head following the February 20 game between the Michigan Wolverines and No. 15 Wisconsin Badgers at the Kohl Center.  With 22 seconds left in the game and Wisconsin's 3rd string players on the floor Howard continued to instruct his players to press full court, forcing an out of bounds in the back court with 4 seconds left on the 10 second clock.  In order to reset the 10 second clock and his press break, Wisconsin Coach Greg Gard took a timeout and coached up his walk on players - instructing them to dribble out the clock once over the half court line, solidifying a 77-63 win.

During the handshakes between the team, Michigan coach Juwan Howard expressed his displeasure with the timeouts and then attempted to walk past, refusing to shake Gard's hand. Gard grabbed Howard in an attempt to explain the timeout.  Howard responded by grabbing Gard's shirt and pointing his finger in Gard's face, shouting "Don't F'ing touch me".  Asst. Coaches, Players and Law Enforcement stepped in to separate the coaches.  Through the pushing and shoving things continued to escalate, and Howard reached across 2 Asst. Coaches, hitting Krabbenhoft with an open hand in the head. This led to both teams fighting each other. While most of the fight was pushing and shoving, at least three players threw punches; forward Moussa Diabaté for Michigan who was a starter for the game, forward Terrance Williams II for Michigan, and guard Jahcobi Neath for Wisconsin. The actions of both coaches and the players were condemned, which Howard receiving the majority for his physical contact against Krabbenhoft. The Big Ten Conference released a statement that they were reviewing the postgame events. The following day, Howard was fined $40,000 and Gard $10,000 for violating the Big Ten's sportsmanship policy.  Howard was also suspended for the remainder of Michigan's season for his conduct (5 games). Diabate, Williams II, and Neath were each suspended one game.  Krabbenhoft was not penalized for the event.

Career statistics

College

|-
| style="text-align:left;"| 2005–06
| style="text-align:left;"| Wisconsin
| 31 || 0 || 16.3 || .347 || .276 || .700 || 4.2 || 1.4 || 0.4 || 0.2 || 3.6
|-
| style="text-align:left;"| 2006–07
| style="text-align:left;"| Wisconsin
| 36 || 1 || 20.1 || .492 || .400 || .706 || 4.8 || 1.6 || 0.6 || 0.1 || 4.8
|-
| style="text-align:left;"| 2007–08
| style="text-align:left;"| Wisconsin
| 36 || 36 || 31.1 || .485|| .214 || .750 || 6.5 || 2.5 || 0.7 || 0.2 || 7.6
|-
| style="text-align:left;"| 2008–09
| style="text-align:left;"| Wisconsin
| 33 || 33 || 30.4 || .480 || .364 || .846 || 6.7 || 2.5 || 0.9 || 0.5 || 8.2
|- class="sortbottom"
| style="text-align:center;" colspan="2"| Career 
| 136 || 70 || 24.6 || .462 || .313|| .757 || 5.6 || 2.0 || 0.6 || 0.2 || 6.1

References

External links
SDSU coaching bio
NBA D-League Profile
Eurocup Profile
Eurobasket.com Profile
Greek League Profile 

1987 births
Living people
American men's basketball coaches
American men's basketball players
American expatriate basketball people in Greece
American expatriate basketball people in South Korea
American expatriate basketball people in Spain
Basketball coaches from South Dakota
Basketball players from South Dakota
CB Breogán players
Greek Basket League players
Panellinios B.C. players
People from Spring Valley, Illinois
Power forwards (basketball)
Seoul SK Knights players
Shooting guards
Sioux Falls Skyforce players
Small forwards
South Dakota State Jackrabbits men's basketball coaches
Wisconsin Badgers men's basketball coaches
Wisconsin Badgers men's basketball players